Pramuka Sudesh (born 4 May 1982) is a Sri Lankan former cricketer. He played in 65 first-class and 42 List A matches between 2002/03 and 2010/11. He made his Twenty20 debut on 17 August 2004, for Colts Cricket Club in the 2004 SLC Twenty20 Tournament.

References

External links
 

1982 births
Living people
Sri Lankan cricketers
Badureliya Sports Club cricketers
Colts Cricket Club cricketers
Panadura Sports Club cricketers
Place of birth missing (living people)